The Order of Work and Production is one of the badges of honor in Iran, established by "Council of Iran Ministers" on November 21, 1990. The order has three classes, and is awarded by President of Iran. According to "Article 13" of the "Regulations on the Awarding of Government Orders" of Iran, the "Order of Work and Production" is awarded to persons who have achieved remarkable results in industry or agriculture in one of the following areas:

 Increasing the production capacity of the country in terms of quantity and quality
 Proper use of technical facilities and economic resources
 Designing or implementing important industrial and agricultural projects
 Innovations and inventions to improve working and production practices and increase productivity
 Raising the level of technical and professional knowledge
 Creating the best Islamic and human relations in the workplace

Recipients

Types
The "Order of Work and Production" has three types of medal:

See also
 Order of Freedom (Iran)
 Order of Altruism
 Order of Research
 Order of Mehr
 Order of Justice (Iran)
 Order of Construction
 Order of Knowledge
 Order of Education and Pedagogy
 Order of Persian Politeness
 Order of Independence (Iran)
 Order of Service
 Order of Courage (Iran)
 Order of Culture and Art
 Order of Merit and Management

References

External links
 Orders of Iran Regulations in diagrams
 Orders of Iran in diagrams
 Types of Iran's badges and their material benefits

CS1 uses Persian-language script (fa)
Awards established in 1990
Civil awards and decorations of Iran
1990 establishments in Iran